Jean-Jacques Amelot de Chaillou (30 April 1689 – 7 May 1749, Paris) was a French politician. He was marquis of Combrande, baron de Châtillon-sur-Indre, seigneur de Chaillou.

Biography
From a family of magistrates, he was in turn made avocat général aux requêtes de la maison du roi, maître des requêtes ordinaires (1712), intendant of the généralité of La Rochelle (1720–26), intendant des finances (1726), Secretary of State for Foreign Affairs (1737–44) and surintendant des Postes (1737).

He was elected to the Académie française en 1727 et membre honoraire de l'Académie des sciences in 1741.

In 1716 he married the daughter of the businessman and theatre head Gio Paolo Bombarda - she died three years later. His child by his second marriage was Antoine-Jean Amelot de Chaillou.

External links

 Académie française

1689 births
1747 deaths
French Foreign Ministers
Members of the Académie Française
Members of the French Academy of Sciences
Secretaries of State of Ancien Régime France